Jørgen Ryg (11 August 1927 – 28 August 1981) was a Danish comedian, jazz musician (trumpet) and actor. Best known for his comical monologues on stage, he also appeared in 37 films between 1954 and 1978. He won the Bodil Award for Best Actor in a Supporting Role for his role as adjutant Mühlhauser in Lenin, You Rascal, You.

Filmography 

  (1954)
  (1956)
  (1956)
 Krudt og klunker (1958)
  (1959)
  (1960)
 Forelsket i København (1960)
  (1961)
  (1961)
 Det tossede paradis (1962)
 En af dagene (1963)
  (1963)
 Vi har det jo dejligt (1963)
  (1963)
 Selvmordsskolen (1964)
 Don Olsen kommer til byen (1964)
 I, a Lover (1966)
  (1966)
  (1966)
  (1967)
  (1967)
 Må jeg lege med (1968)
 Något att tala om i framtiden (1968)
 Glassplinten (1969)
 Nøglen til paradis (1970)
 Automobilkirkegården (1971)
 Lenin, din gavtyv (1972)
 Nu går den på Dagmar (1972)
 Hashtræet (1973)
 En forglemmelse (1973)
 Friere (1973)
  (1974)
  (1974)
 Julefrokosten (1976)
 Alt på et bræt (1977)
  (1978)
 Fængslende feriedage (1978)

References

External links 
 

1927 births
1981 deaths
20th-century Danish male actors
Best Supporting Actor Bodil Award winners
Danish male film actors
Male actors from Copenhagen